The HEL cell line is an immortalised cell line from a 30-years old male Acute erythroid leukemia patient, used in biomedical research。

HEL cell is capable of induced globin synthesis, producing mainly Gγ and Aγ chains.

See also
Other cell lines in LL-100 panel

References

External links
Cellosaurus entry for HEL

Human cell lines